Chorlton-by-Backford is a former civil parish in the Borough of Cheshire West and Chester and ceremonial county of Cheshire, England, approximately  to the north of Chester. It was abolished in 2015 and merged into the civil parish of Backford. 
Chorlton Hall is a Grade II listed building within the area. 

In the 2001 census it had a population of 80,
increasing to 124 at the 2011 census. 

The name is likely derived from the Old English words ceorl (meaning a free peasant) and tūn (a farmstead or settlement).

See also

Listed buildings in Chorlton-by-Backford
Chorlton, Cheshire West and Chester

References

External links

Former civil parishes in Cheshire
Cheshire West and Chester